Sepioteuthis, commonly known as reef squids or oval squids, is a genus of pencil squid. Reef squids are easily recognizable by their large rounded fins that extend along almost the entire length of their mantles, giving them a superficial resemblance to cuttlefish.

Species
Three species are currently recognized, though S. australis and S. lessoniana are believed to be cryptic species complexes.

Sepioteuthis australis, southern reef squid or southern calamary
Sepioteuthis lessoniana, bigfin reef squid or northern calamary
Sepioteuthis sepioidea, Caribbean reef squid

An additional species, S. loliginiformis, was described in 1828, but its validity is questionable. However, if the species turns out to be the same as S. australis or S. lessoniana, S. loliginiformis would be the senior synonym and replace the younger name currently in use.

References

External links

Tree of Life web project: Loliginidae

Squid